Garra mlapparaensis is a species of ray-finned fish in the genus Garra, endemic to Kerala in India.

References 

Garra
Fish described in 2011